Jinshantun District is a district of the city of Yichun, Heilongjiang, People's Republic of China.

Notes and references 

Jinshantun